Edward Martyn Rix  (born 15 August 1943) is a British botanist, collector, horticulturalist and author. Following completion of a PhD on Fritillaria at Cambridge University, he worked in Zurich, Switzerland and at the Royal Horticultural Society gardens at Wisley. He is the author of many books and articles on plants and horticulture and is the editor of Curtis's Botanical Magazine, based at the Royal Botanic Gardens, Kew in London.

Life 

Born on 15 August 1943 to Edward Lionel Reusner and Elizabeth (Joyce) Rix, Martyn Rix was educated at Trinity College Dublin (MA), and Corpus Christi College, Cambridge University, where he received his PhD at biology school in 1971 for his dissertation on Fritillaria in Greece and Turkey (partially published as ). He married Alison Jane Goatcher in 1983, with whom he frequently collaborates, and they have two daughters.

Work 

Following completion of his doctorate he worked as a fellow at the Institute of Systematic Botany, University of Zurich, studying water weeds of India and co-authoring Waterplants of the World (1971–1973), before becoming a botanist at the Royal Horticultural Society, Wisley (1974–1978). He travelled widely, collecting and photographing plants, including botanical expeditions to China, Mexico, South Africa and Argentina, and introducing a large number of plants into cultivation in Europe and North America. He has been involved in the design and planting of gardens in many parts of the world including California, Bermuda, the Virgin Islands, Turkey, France and Italy. Together with plant photographer Roger Phillips, David Lindsay and Sam Phillips, he ran an internet site called RogersRoses.

Martyn Rix works at the Royal Botanic Gardens, Kew and is a Fellow of the Linnean Society of London (FLS). His major interest is Liliaceae, especially Fritillaria.

Publications 

Rix has authored contributions in many major botanical texts including The European Garden Flora, Flora Europaea,  Flora of Turkey, the Kew Bulletin and has been editor of Curtis's Botanical Magazine since 2003. He is the author of a number of books including Art of the Plant World, Art in Nature and Redoute Album. The latter deals with the work of the botanical artist Pierre-Joseph Redouté. he has also contributed to television programmes such as  The Quest for the Rose (BBC). Together with Roger Phillips he has contributed to over thirty plant books. Martyn Rix writes for magazines such as Country Life, Gardens Illustrated, The English Garden Magazine and Cornucopia.

List of selected publications 
 see

Books 

 Water Plants of the World: a Manual for the Identification of the Genera of Freshwater Macrophytes , C.D.K. Cook, B.J. Gut, E. Martyn Rix, Jakob Schneller, Marta Seitz, Dr. W. Junk B.V. Publishers (1974),  
 Art of the Plant World, Martyn Rix, Penguin Group USA (1982), 
 Garden Open Today: To Celebrate the Diamond Jubilee of the National Gardens Scheme, Martyn Rix, Alison Rix, Viking (1987), 
 Redoute Album, Martyn Rix, Alison Rix Studio Edns. (1990) 310 pp. 
 Art in Nature, Martyn Rix, : Studio Edns. (1991), 
 The Quest for the Rose, Roger Phillips, Martyn Rix, Random House Inc (1994), 
 Best Rose Guide: A Comprehensive Selection, Roger Phillips, Martyn Rix, Firefly Books Ltd (2004), 
 The Botanical Garden 2005 Calendar, Roger Phillips & Martyn Rix, Firefly Books Ltd (2004), 
 The Botanical Garden 2006 Calendar, Roger Phillips & Martyn Rix, Firefly Books Ltd (2005), 
 The Botanical Garden 2007 Calendar, Roger Phillips & Martyn Rix, Firefly Books Ltd (2006), 
 Subtropical and Dry Climate Plants: The Definitive Practical Guide, Martyn Rix, Timber Press (2006), 
 Growing bulbs Croom Helm. 209 pp. (1983) 
 Roses Random House Roger Phillips, E. Martyn Rix 224 pp. (1988) 
 The art of botanical illustration.  Arch Cape Press. 224 pp. (1990)
  Conservatory and indoor plants. The garden plant series, Volume 1 of Conservatory and indoor plants: plants for warm gardens. Roger Phillips, E. Martyn Rix, Alison Rix Pan. 286 pp. (1998) 
 The ultimate guide to roses: a comprehensive selection Roger Phillips, E. Martyn Rix Macmillan. 288 pp. (2004) 
  Treasures of botanical art: icons from the Shirley Sherwood and Kew collections. Sherwood, Shirley, E. Martyn Rix Kew Pub. 272 pp. (2008) 
  see also Flora Europaea
 

 Articles 

 
 
 
 -----, Brian Mathew 2007. Puschkinia peshmenii Hyacinthaceae. Curtis's Botanical Magazine 24 ( 1 ): 54-57
 

 Thesis 

 

 Awards 

In 1998 Rix was awarded the Royal Horticultural Society's Veitch Memorial Gold Medal.

 Legacy 

Martyn Rix is the botanical authority for 33 taxa that bear his name, such as Fritillaria gussichiae.

The following plants are named after Martyn Rix:
 Bellevalia rixii Wendelbo
 Fritillaria rixii'' Zaharof

References

Bibliography

External links 

 Kent Alpine Gardener's Diary Talk given at Alpine Garden Society, Kent 2015

British botanists
1943 births
Living people